The Norwegian film industry produced over fifty feature films in 2014. This article fully lists all non-pornographic films, including short films, that had a release date in that year and which were at least partly made by Norway. It does not include films first released in previous years that had release dates in 2014.

Major releases

See also

 2014 in film
 2014 in Norway
 Cinema of Norway
 List of Norwegian submissions for the Academy Award for Best Foreign Language Film

References

External links

Norwegian
Films
2014